Defending champions Jiske Griffioen and Esther Vergeer defeated Korie Homan and Sharon Walraven in the final, 6–1, 6–1 to win the women's doubles wheelchair tennis title at the 2007 US Open.

Seeds
 Jiske Griffioen /  Esther Vergeer (champions)
 Korie Homan /  Sharon Walraven (finals)

Draw

Finals

External links
Draw
PDF Draw

Wheelchair Women's Doubles
U.S. Open, 2007 Women's Doubles